An overstep is a structural discontinuity between two approximately parallel overlapping or underlapping geological faults.

Overstep may also refer to:
Overstepping, a fault causing no-ball in cricket
Overstep (album), a 2014 album by Mike Gordon 
Oversteps (album), a 2010 album by Autechre
Overstepping (album), a 1998 album by Eve Beglarian